Alina Grijseels  (born 12 April 1996) is a German handball player for Borussia Dortmund and the German national team.

She participated at the 2018 European Women's Handball Championship.

Achievements 
Handball-Bundesliga Frauen:
Winner: 2021
DHB-Pokal:
Finalist: 2016

References

External links

1996 births
Living people
German female handball players
People from Wesel
Sportspeople from Düsseldorf (region)
21st-century German women